The Bembicinae comprise a large subfamily of crabronid wasps that includes over 80 genera and over 1800 species which have a worldwide distribution.  They excavate nests in the soil, frequently in sandy soils, and store insects of several orders, for example Diptera, Orthoptera, Hemiptera, Lepidoptera and Odonata in the burrows. Some species are kleptoparasites of other Bembicinae. The different subgroups of Bembicinae are each quite distinctive, and rather well-defined, with clear morphological and behavioral differences between them.

Bembicines were originally a part of a single large family, the Sphecidae, then for many years were treated as a separate family, and recently have been placed back into a larger family, the Crabronidae this time.

References

External links 
 Bugguide.net

Crabronidae
Apocrita subfamilies